Ichoronyssus is a genus of mites in the family Laelapidae.

Species
 Ichoronyssus jacksoni Radford, 1940
 Ichoronyssus miniopterus (Womersley, 1957)
 Ichoronyssus scutatus (Kolenati, 1857)
 Ichoronyssus ventralis Wen Tin-Whan, 1975

References

Laelapidae